Ischia is an island in the Province of Naples, Campania. Ischia may also refer to:

Places
Ischia (Pergine Valsugana), a civil parish of Pergine Valsugana (TN), Trentino-Alto Adige
Ischia, Campania, a town in the island of Ischia, Campania
S.S. Ischia Isolaverde, the town's football team
Ischia di Castro, a municipality in the Province of Viterbo, Lazio

People
Carlos Ischia, Argentine footballer and coach

Other uses
Ischia (grape), another name for the French/German wine grape Pinot Noir Précoce

See also
ISCA (disambiguation)
Ischitella, a municipality in the Province of Foggia, Apulia
Ischium, a human hip bone